Joseph Horsfall Johnson (7 June 1847- 16 May 1928) was the first Bishop of Los Angeles in The Episcopal Church. He founded The Bishop's School in La Jolla, California and served on the Pomona College board of trustees. The Bishop Johnson College of Nursing at Good Samaritan Hospital was named for him. He was the father of architect Reginald Davis Johnson.

References

1847 births
1928 deaths
Williams College alumni
Episcopal bishops of Los Angeles